William LeMassena (May 23, 1916 – January 19, 1993) was an American actor. He was best known for his roles in Broadway and off-Broadway productions, the film All That Jazz (1979), and the soap opera As the World Turns (1985–1992).

Early life and career
LeMassena was born in Glen Ridge, New Jersey on May 23, 1916, the son of Margery L. (1883–1942) and William Henry LeMassena (1874–1944). He graduated from New York University.

LeMassena made his acting debut in the 1940 Broadway production of The Taming of the Shrew, starring Alfred Lunt and Lynn Fontanne. He then became a regular part of the Lunt's unofficial rep company of actors, including Sydney Greenstreet, Thomas Gomez, and Montgomery Clift.

In the later part of his career, LeMassena did several seasons of regional work at Meadowbrook Theatre in Rochester, Michigan, and also had a long run in Broadway's Deathtrap.

He appeared as the Heavenly Friend who serves as a guide to Gordon MacRae on his return trip to Earth in the 1956 film version of Rodgers and Hammerstein's Carousel. Massena appeared in other roles, however, including a stint towards the end of his life as Ambrose Bingham, on the daytime soap opera As the World Turns. 

He also appeared throughout the 1960s in several television adaptations of stage plays on the Hallmark Hall of Fame, including a 1960 production of Shakespeare's The Tempest, starring Maurice Evans, Lee Remick, Roddy McDowall, and Richard Burton (LeMassena was Antonio), as well as a 1967 production of Bernard Shaw's Saint Joan, starring Geneviève Bujold in her American television debut as Joan of Arc, and featuring LeMassena as Jean d'Estivet.

He also appeared in the first (and so far, the only) television production of the operetta Naughty Marietta, in the role of Rudolfo.

Personal life and death
LeMassena was a close friend of Montgomery Clift, with whom he was possibly in a  relationship.

He died of lung cancer at his home in New Suffolk, New York on January 19, 1993, at age 76.

Filmography

Film

Television

References

External links 
 
 

1916 births
1993 deaths
20th-century American male actors
American male film actors
American male stage actors
American male television actors
Male actors from New Jersey
People from Glen Ridge, New Jersey
New York University alumni
Deaths from lung cancer